Phymatodes varius is a species of beetle in the family Cerambycidae.

References

Phymatodes
Beetles described in 1776
Taxa named by Johan Christian Fabricius